This is a list of the largest steel-producing companies in the world mostly based on the list by the World Steel Association. This list ranks steelmakers by volume of steel production in millions of tonnes and includes all steelmakers with production over 10 million in 2021.

The World Steel Association compiles a list from its members every year. Note that due to mergers, year-to-year figures for some producers are not comparable. Also note that not all steel is the same; some steel is more valuable than other steel, so volume is not the same as turnover.

Top producers by volume

Other top steel producers by volume
 Acerinox, Spain
 Aisha Steel Mills, Pakistan
 Aichi Steel Corporation, Japan
 Allegheny Technologies, United States
 Altos Hornos de México, Mexico
 Angang Steel Company Limited, China
 Anyang Steel, China
 Aperam, Luxembourg
 Arrium, Australia
 Arvedi, Italy
 BlueScope, Australia
 British Steel Ltd, United Kingdom
 BSRM, Bangladesh
 Byelorussian Steel Works, Belarus
 Carpenter Technology Corporation, United States
 Celsa Group, Spain
 Commercial Metals Company, United States
 Companhia Siderúrgica Nacional, Brazil
 Crucible Industries, United States
 Donghai Special Steel, China
 Dongkuk Steel, South Korea
 Erdemir, Turkey
 Essar Steel, India
 EZDK, Egypt
 Handan Zongheng Iron and Steel, China 
 Illich Steel and Iron Works, Ukraine
 Ilva (company), Italy
 International Steels Limited, Pakistan
 ISD Corporation, Ukraine
 Ittefaq Group, Pakistan
 Japan Steel Works, Japan
 Jindal Steel and Power, India
 Jinxi Iron and Steel, China
 , China 
 Kobe Steel, Japan
 Libyan Iron and Steel Company, Libya
 Mahindra Ugine Steel, India
 Marcegaglia, Italy
Maghreb Steel (Morocco)
 Mechel, Russia
 Metalloinvest, Russia
 Mitsui & Co., Japan
 MMX Mineração, Brazil
 Nisshin Steel, Japan
 Olympic Steel, United States
 Outokumpu, Finland
 Pakistan Steel Mills, Pakistan
 Panzhihua Iron and Steel, China
 Qatar Steel, Qatar
 Rautaruukki, Finland
 Reliance Steel & Aluminum Co., United States
 Sahaviriya Steel Industries, Thailand
 Salzgitter AG, Germany
 SeAH Beestel, South Korea
 Schnitzer Steel Industries, United States
 Sheffield Forgemasters, United Kingdom
 SIDERPERU, Peru
 Sidetur, Venezuela
Sonasid (Morocco]] in 1967)
 SSAB, Sweden
 Steel Dynamics, United States
 Stelco, Canada
 Tangshan Guofeng Iron and Steel, China
 Tenaris, Luxembourg
 Ternium - Hylsa and Imsa in Mexico, Siderar in Argentina
 Timken Company, United States
 Tuwairqi Steel Mills, Pakistan
 Usiminas, Brazil
 Vallourec, France
 VISA Steel, India
 Visakhapatnam Steel Plant, India
 Voestalpine, Austria
 Votorantim Siderurgia, Brazil

Steel producers merged with other companies, split or no longer operating
AK Steel (bought by Clevland-Cliffs)
Algoma Steel (assets bought by Essar Steel in April 2007)
Arbed (merged in 2002 forming Arcelor)
Arcelor (merged with Mittal forming ArcelorMittal)
Baosteel Group (merged with Wuhan Group forming China Baowu Steel Group)
Benxi Steel Group (merged with Ansteel Group)
Bethlehem Steel (assets bought by ISG in 2003. ISG merged with Mittal, now ArcelorMittal)
 (bankrupted in 2016)
British Steel Corporation formed in 1967 when steel was nationalised in the UK. Privatised again in 1988.
British Steel plc (merged with Koninklijke Hoogovens (NL) in 1999 to form Corus, now Tata Steel)
Carnegie Steel Company (sold to U.S. Steel in 1901)
Cockerill-Sambre (acquired by Usinor in 1998, which became part of Arcelor in 2002, now ArcelorMittal)
Corus Group (acquired by Tata Steel in 2007)
Dofasco in Hamilton, Ontario (acquired by Arcelor, now ArcelorMittal)
Falck Group (turned the production to renewable energy with Falck Renewables) 
Gruppo Riva (split into ILVA and Riva Forni Electtrici in 2013)
Hoesch Stahl AG (acquired by ThyssenKrupp)
Inland Steel Company (acquired by Ispat International became Mittal, now ArcelorMittal)
International Steel Group (merged with Mittal, now ArcelorMittal)
Jones and Laughlin Steel Company (acquired by Ling-Temco-Vought, renamed LTV Steel, acquired by ISG)
Koninklijke Hoogovens (merged with British Steel (UK) in 1999 to form Corus, now Tata Steel)
Krupp (merged with Thyssen to form ThyssenKrupp in 1999)
Kunming Steel, China (merged into China Baowu Steel Group)
Lackawanna Steel Company (acquired by Bethlehem Steel in 1922, plants closed in 1982)
Laiwu Steel (merged into Shandong Iron and Steel Group)
Lone Star Steel Company (acquired by U.S. Steel in 2007)
Maanshan Iron & Steel (acquired by China Baowu in 2019)
Mittal Steel Company (merged with Arcelor forming ArcelorMittal)
National Steel Corporation (acquired by U.S. Steel in 2003)
Northwestern Steel and Wire (reorganized and operating as Sterling Steel Company)
Pingxiang Iron and Steel (merged with Jiujiang Steel forming Fangda Steel)
Republic Steel (merged into LTV Steel, acquired by ISG, merged with Mittal, now ArcelorMittal)
Rouge Steel (formerly owned by Ford Motor Corporation; acquired by Severstal in 2004)
Steel Company of Wales (absorbed into British Steel Corporation in 1967)
Taiyuan Iron and Steel Group (merged into China Baowu Steel Group)
Timken (split to form TimkenSteel Corporation in 2014)
Thyssen (merged with Krupp to form ThyssenKrupp in 1999)
Weirton Steel (acquired by ISG, which merged with Mittal, now ArcelorMittal)
Wuhan Iron and Steel Corporation (merged with Baosteel forming China Baowu Steel Group)
Youngstown Sheet and Tube (acquired by Jones and Laughlin Steel Company ca. 1977)

References 

Steel
 
Steel industry